Batocera davidis is a species of beetle from the family Cerambycidae discovered by Leon Fairmaire in 1878. The beetle occurs in China, Taiwan, and Vietnam.

References

Batocerini
Beetles of Asia
Beetles of Oceania
Beetles described in 1878